Sunbus Cairns, previously Marlin Coast Sunbus, was the principal bus operator in Cairns, Queensland operating services under the TransLink (Queensland) scheme in the Cairns region. It is one of Sunbus' operations. As of late 2022, Sunbus has changed its name as part of a business re-brand by the parent company, Kinetic. Sunbus has now been dissolved into the Kinetic brand with its fleet of buses reflecting this change.

History
In 1995, Harry Blundred, the proprietor of Thames Transit in the United Kingdom, was awarded the operating rights to route services in Cairns by the Government of Queensland. It initially was a joint venture with Beach Bus and West Cairns Bus Service, but Blundred took full control shortly after.

As part of the deal, Sunbus was also responsible for the operation of school bus services in the region, however these were sold in 1997 to fellow British bus operator Stagecoach.

In April 2008, Blundred sold Marlin Coast Sunbus along with the other Sunbus operations to Transit Australia Group.

In April 2019, Transit Australia Group was purchased by AATS Group, parent company of Skybus and majority owned by OPTrust. In August 2019, AATS Group was rebranded the Kinetic Group.

This is a separate operation to Love's Bus Service Cairns which is also owned by the Kinetic Group.

In late 2022, Sunbus was officially branded as KINETIC with all new advertising now showing the Kinetic Brand. All new buses will display the Kinetic logo with the current fleet of Sunbus slowly being updated to reflect the new brand name. The current website for Sunbus will stay active until early 2023 before it will be deactivated, directing customers to the new Kinetic website.

Service Area
Sunbus operates from Palm Cove and Trinity Beach in the north, and as far south as Gordonvale and Edmonton. The area with the most coverage is along the Captain Cook Highway between Smithfield Shopping Centre and Cairns CBD.

Bus routes
110 Palm Cove to Cairns Central Shopping Centre
111 Kewarra Beach to Cairns Central Shopping Centre
112 Yorkeys Knob to Smithfield
113 Smithfield to Cairns Central Shopping Center (via Dunne Rd)
120 Smithfield to Cairns Central Shopping Centre (via Holloways Beach)
121 Redlynch to Cairns Central Shopping Centre
122 Redlynch to James Cook University
123 James Cook University to Cairns Central Shopping Centre
130 Manunda to Cairns Central Shopping Centre (via Greenslopes St)
131 Manunda to Cairns Central Shopping Centre (via Collins Ave)
133 Earlville to Cairns City bus station
140 Edmonton to Cairns Central Shopping Centre
141 Coconut Village to Cairns Central Shopping Centre
142 Edmonton to Cairns Central Shopping Centre
143 Mt Sheridan to Cairns Central Shopping Centre
143 Mt Sheridan to Cairns Central Shopping Centre (via Bruce Hwy)
143W Mt Sheridan to Cairns Central Shopping Centre (via Bayview Heights)
150 Gordonvale to Cairns Central Shopping Centre
150 Gordonvale to Cairns Central Shopping Centre 
150E Gordonvale to Cairns Central Shopping Centre (via Edmonton and White Rock)

Fleet
As of June 2013, the fleet consisted of 51 buses, primarily Bustech bodied Volvo B12BLEs, Bustech MDi and XDis. The fleet livery is light blue.

See also
TransLink (Queensland)

External links
 Showbus gallery

References

Bus companies of Queensland
Kinetic Group companies
Transport companies established in 1995
Transport in Cairns
1995 establishments in Australia